Red Rock Cove is an embayment on San Pablo Bay in Richmond, California. It is a cove named after Red Rock Island and lays along Point Molate Beach Park.

Notes

Geography of Richmond, California